Yucheng is a county-level city located in the northwest of Shandong province, China. It is administered by the prefecture-level city of Dezhou.

History 
The name of "Yucheng" means "the city of Great Yu", who is believed to be the first king of the Xia dynasty, and an ancient hero specializing in fighting with flood. The county of Yucheng was set up during the Tang dynasty in 692 AD.

Administrative divisions
As 2012, this city is divided to 1 subdistrict, 7 towns and 3 townships.
Subdistricts
Shizhong Subdistrict

Towns

Townships
Litun Township
Shiliwang Township
Juzhen Township

Climate

References

External links 
  Official homepage

Yucheng
Dezhou
Cities in Shandong